{{Infobox Australian football club
|color1 = #981952 
|color2 = #FECD29 
|color3 = solid #192981
| clubname  = Brisbane Lions
| image     = Brisbane Lions logo 2010.svg
| image_size = 180px
| fullname  = Brisbane Bears-Fitzroy Football Club Limited, trading as Brisbane Lions Australian Football Club
| nicknames = 
| season    = 2022
| afterfinals  =4th 
| home&away  = 6th
| topgoalkicker  = Charlie Cameron (47)
| bestandfairest = 
| bestandfairestname = Merrett–Murray Medal
| founded   = From a merger of:

Fitzroy Football Club (formed 1883) Brisbane Bears (formed 1987)On 1 November 1996
| colours   =  Maroon  Blue  Gold
| league    = AFL: Senior menAFLW: Senior womenVFL: Reserves men
| chairman  = Andrew Wellington
| ceo       = Greg Swann
| coach     = AFL: Chris FaganAFLW: Craig StarcevichVFL: Ben Hudson
| captain   = AFL: Harris Andrews and Lachie NealeAFLW: Breanna Koenen
| premierships = AFL  (3)AFLW (1)Reserves (5)
| ground    = AFL: Brisbane Cricket Ground (1997-present)AFLW: Brighton Homes Arena (10,000)VFL: Brighton Homes Arena
| capacity  = 
| trainingground = Brighton Homes Arena (2022–present)
| kit_alt1        = 
| pattern_b1      = _brisbane2023h
| pattern_sh1     =  _goldsides
| pattern_so1     = _brisbane2023h
| body1           = 78184A
| shorts1         = 78184A
| socks1          = 78184A
| pattern_name1   = 
| kit_alt2        = 
| pattern_b2      = _brisbane2023a
| pattern_sh2     =  _sides_on_white
| pattern_so2     = _bluetop
| body2           = FF0000
| shorts2         = 0039A6
| socks2          = ff0000
| pattern_name2   = 
| kit_alt3        = 
| pattern_b3      = _brisbane2023c
| pattern_sh3     =  _sides_on_white
| pattern_so3     = _brisbane2022h
| body3           = FFFFFF
| shorts3         = 0039A6
| socks3          = 78184A
| url       = lions.com.au
| jumper    =
| current   = 2022 Brisbane Lions season
|pattern_name3=Clash}}

The Brisbane Lions is a professional Australian rules football club based in Brisbane, Queensland, that plays in the Australian Football League (AFL).

The club was formed in late 1996 via a merger of the Melbourne-based 1883 foundation VFL club the Fitzroy Lions, and the 1987 Queensland based expansion club the Brisbane Bears, with the colours of maroon, blue, and gold being drawn from both parent clubs.

The Lions are one of the most successful AFL club of the 2000s, appearing in four consecutive Grand Finals from 2001 to 2004 and winning three premierships (2001, 2002, 2003). They play home matches at the Gabba, which was also the site of their offices and training facilities until moving these to Springfield Central Stadium in Ipswich in 2022.

The Lions also field teams in two other competitions. They were a foundation team in the AFL Women's competition in 2017 and have featured in four grand finals in that time, winning the premiership in 2021 and finishing runners-up on the other occasions. They have also fielded a reserve men's team in several leagues over the years, and since 2021 the reserves team has competed in the Victorian Football League.

Pre-Merger History

Fitzroy Football Club (1883-1996)

The history of the Brisbane Lions traces back to the formation of the Melbourne-based Fitzroy Football Club on 26 September 1883 at The Brunswick Hotel. The Victorian Football Association (VFA) made changes to their rules, allowing Fitzroy to join as the seventh club in 1884, playing in the maroon and blue colours of the local Normanby Junior Football Club. 

They quickly became one of the most successful clubs, consistently in the top four, and drawing large crowds to their home at the Brunswick Street Oval in Edinburgh Gardens. This success was capped off by Fitzroy winning the VFA premiership in 1895.

Fitzroy would then go onto be one of the eight break away clubs who formed the Victorian Football League in 1897.
They would continue their VFA form and be a powerhouse in the early days of the new VFL, winning a total of eight premierships, of which seven (1898, 1899, 1904, 1905, 1913, 1916 and 1922) were won whilst they were nicknamed the Maroons and one (1944) as the Gorillas. 
The club also boasted 6 Brownlow Medal winners who were Haydn Bunton Sr., Wilfred Smallhorn, Dinny Ryan, Allan Ruthven, Kevin Murray, and Bernie Quinlan. 

The club changed its nickname to the Lions in 1957, but when Fitzroy was evicted from its home ground of Brunswick St Oval in 1965, this began a sustained period of poor on-field performance and financial losses. Fitzroy entered one of the least successful periods any VFL/AFL club has had. The club finished in the bottom three 11 times in the 1960s and 1970s, including three wooden spoons in four years between 1963 and 1966. The club won only a single game between 1963 and 1964 – known as the Miracle Match when it defeated eventual premiers Geelong in Round 10, 1963 – but its 1964 season was winless, and as of 2023 stands as the only winless season by any club since 1950. 

Despite a revival in the '80s, when the Lions made the finals four times under the coaching of Robert Walls and David Parkin, and the playing group of 1981 Brownlow Medallist Bernie Quinlan, Ron Alexander, Garry Wilson, Gary Pert and Paul Roos, the club's financial situation was perilous.

The VFL's plans to move or merge struggling Fitzroy to Brisbane pre-dated the Brisbane Bears, and negotiations between the league and the club began in 1986 with the playing group voting for a move to Brisbane. However, Fitzroy resisted the move despite significant incentives and in response, the VFL made the decision to cut any further financial assistance to the club, which contributed to its ultimate demise. By the start of the 1996 season, they were almost at the end of their financial tether. With no home ground, back to back wooden spoons, and their future under a cloud, Fitzroy began to consider options for survival. 

Brisbane Bears (1987-1996)

The Brisbane Bears were born in 1987 and initially played home matches at Carrara Stadium on the Gold Coast. In its early days, the club was uncompetitive on the field and struggled to shake the derisive tags which included "The Cararra Koalas" (in reference to the Gold Coast home and the somewhat tame marsupial) and "The Bad News Bears".

After the collapse of the business empire belonging to Bears deputy chairman Christopher Skase and the resignation of chairman Paul Cronin, the club was taken over by the AFL and re-sold to Gold Coast hospitality businessman Reuben Pelerman.
Off-field, Pelerman was losing millions of dollars annually on the club and at one point in 1991 told Bears coach Robert Walls that he was closing it down. The Bears would go onto finish last in 1990 and 1991.

To survive, The Bears experimented with playing matches at the Gabba in Brisbane in 1991, moving all home matches to the venue ahead of the 1993 season. 
As part of the club's move to the Gabba, Pelerman agreed to release the Bears from private ownership and revert to a traditional club structure in which the club's members were able to elect the board.
Membership and attendances instantly tripled now that the club was finally playing in their home city of Brisbane.

The Bears only qualified for the finals series in 1995 and 1996, and the closest the club came to a Grand Final was a preliminary final in 1996, its last year in the competition.

On extremely shaky financial ground, the Bears struggled to generate many revenue opportunities in their short and turbulent ten-year existence. Despite improving its on field fortunes, and drafting exciting young players on such as Michael Voss, Justin Leppitsch, Jason Akermanis, Darryl White, and Nigel Lappin, the club's existence was still at threat due to severe financial problems, and since 1990 The Bears had been actively exploring merger options with Fitzroy.

The Merger
Fitzroy's directors had agreed in principle to merge with the 1996 premiers, North Melbourne, as the "North-Fitzroy Kangaroos". However, that proposal was rejected 15–1 by the AFL Commission, reportedly out of concern that an all-Victorian merge would be too powerful. Instead, Fitzroy was placed into administration, and its administrator accepted an offer to merge its football operations with Brisbane.

The merged team would be based in Brisbane, and Bears coach John Northey would become coach of the merged club. 
However, it adopted an identity, logo, song, and guernsey based on those of Fitzroy, would take eight Fitzroy players in the draft, three Fitzroy representatives would serve on the board (including former Fitzroy champion Laurie Serafini), and the Lions would keep an office in Melbourne.

The eight Fitzroy players who would join the Brisbane Lions were Brad Boyd, Chris Johnson, Jarrod Molloy, John Barker, Nick Carter, Simon Hawking, Scott Bamford and Shane Clayton. 

Fitzroy played its final VFL/AFL game on 1 September 1996 against Fremantle at Subiaco Oval, and The Bears' last match as a separate entity was a preliminary final on Saturday 21 September 1996 at the Melbourne Cricket Ground against North Melbourne. 

The Brisbane Lions were officially launched on 1 November 1996, joining the national competition in 1997.

Merged history
Beginnings: 1997–2000
In their debut year as a combined club, the Lions narrowly made the finals, finishing in eighth position. They ended up with the same win–loss record as fellow 1997 newcomers Port Adelaide, who missed out due to having an inferior percentage. Their first two games were against the eventual grand finalists of that year, Adelaide and St Kilda. They went down to Adelaide by 36 points before recording an emphatic 97-point thrashing of St Kilda in round 2. The Lions met St Kilda again in a cut-throat away qualifying final, going down by 46 points after leading the Saints at half-time. The Brisbane Lions in 1997 remain the only new team in VFL/AFL history to have made the finals in their first season.

Despite a talented playing list, the disruption of the merger and injuries to key players Michael Voss and Brad Boyd took their toll. The Lions would go onto finish in last position at the end of the 1998 season. Accordingly, Northey was sacked as coach with eight rounds remaining in the season. During the off-season, the club hired Leigh Matthews, who in 1990 had delivered Collingwood its first premiership since 1958.

Matthews, who was voted "Player of the Century" in 2000, played his entire career with Hawthorn and brought many of the Hawthorn disciplines to the Lions. Importantly, he forced the Lions to embrace and acknowledge their Fitzroy heritage with murals and records being erected at the Gabba, and past players names being placed on lockers. Within a year, the Lions rose from the bottom of the ladder to fourth. The 1999 season included a Round 20 Gabba match where the Lions led Fremantle by 113 points at half-time after having kicked 21 goals. Their half-time score of 21.5 (131) still remains the highest half-time score in VFL/AFL history. Brisbane would win their first finals as a merged entity against Carlton and the Western Bulldogs before losing to the eventual premiers, the Kangaroos, in a 1999 preliminary final. The Lions played finals again in 2000 but bowed out in the second week after losing an away game to Carlton by 82 points.

In this time period the club drafted and recruited key players who would go onto be pillars of the Lions triple premiership years. Victorian Luke Power, Fitzroy father-son selection Jonathan Brown, and exciting WA product Simon Black would come via the draft, and Brad Scott, Mal Michael, and ex-Fitzroy B&F winner Martin Pike would be recruited from Hawthorn, Collingwood, and North Melbourne respectively.

 Triple premiership success: 2001–2004 

The Lions began 2001 by making the final of the Ansett Australia Cup, their first pre-season grand final. They went down by 85 points away to Port Adelaide, who they had also been scheduled to play in Round 1 at the same venue. After an inconsistent start to their 2002 season, the Lions took on the reigning premiers Essendon in Round 10. Brisbane finished as 28-point victors, and head coach Leigh Matthews famously used a Predator quote, "if it bleeds, we can kill it", to inspire his team for the game. The Lions would then win 16 games straight, finishing the year undefeated and booking their place in the 2001 AFL Grand Final to play Essendon.

Going in as underdogs, Brisbane started the game well, scoring the first goal of the match from a free kick awarded to Alastair Lynch for holding against Dustin Fletcher. Essendon fought back late in the first quarter and then took control of the game in the second term. The Lions' poor kicking for goal almost put them out of the game in the second quarter as Essendon blew their lead out to 20 points late in the term. 

However, The Lions managed to overrun Essendon in the third term, kicking six goals to one and turning a 14-point deficit into a 16-point lead. Brisbane's pace in the midfield and the tiring legs of most of the Essendon players played a pivotal role in them taking full control of the game in the second half. 
The Lions won their first premiership as a merged club comfortably, with a final score of 15.18 (108) to 12.10 (82).

The win was topped off with Lions utility player Shaun Hart winning the Norm Smith Medal after being judged best on ground in the Grand Final.

In 2002, the Lions won a club-record 17 games, spending most of the season firmly entrenched in the top two with Port Adelaide. They narrowly missed out on the minor premiership following a final round defeat to the Power in Adelaide. In the finals, the Lions claimed easy home victories over the two Adelaide-based teams on their way to a second consecutive Grand Final. They faced Collingwood, who had surprised many that year after having missed the finals the previous seven seasons. Brisbane ended up defeating the Magpies 9.12 (66) to 10.15 (75) in cold and wet conditions at the Melbourne Cricket Ground. Early in the contest, the Lions lost both ruckman Beau McDonald and utility player Martin Pike to injury and had to complete the match with a limited bench.

In 2003, the Lions became the first team in the national era to win three consecutive premierships. With a number of players under an injury cloud—and having lost to Collingwood in a qualifying final at the Melbourne Cricket Ground three weeks previously–the Lions went into the game as underdogs. However, they sealed their place in history as an AFL dynasty by thrashing the Magpies in cool but sunny conditions. At one stage in the final quarter, the Lions led by almost 80 points before relaxing when the match was well and truly won, allowing Collingwood to score the last four goals. The final score of 20.14 (134) to 12.12 (84) saw the club become only the fourth in VFL/AFL history to win three consecutive premierships and the first since the creation of the AFL. Simon Black claimed the Norm Smith Medal with a dominant 39-possession match, the most possessions ever gathered by a player in a grand final; the record was equalled by Melbourne's Christian Petracca 18 years later in the 2021 Grand Final.

During their premiership years, the club took the premiership cups to Brunswick Street Oval, Fitzroy, each morning after the grand final. Honouring the club's history at their traditional home ground was not only an important way of connecting with Melbourne-based former Fitzroy fans who'd supported the Brisbane Lions from the beginning but was a key step in winning over the disaffected Fitzroy fans who had not started supporting the Brisbane Lions post-merger.

The 2004 season saw Brisbane remain in the top portion of the ladder for most of the season. Reaching the finals in second position, Brisbane controversially had to travel to Melbourne to play against Geelong in the preliminary final due to a contract between the Melbourne Cricket Ground (MCG) and the Australian Football League (AFL) that required one preliminary final to be played each year at the MCG. Port Adelaide had finished on top of the ladder and hosted the other preliminary final in Adelaide. Former player Jason Akermanis has since claimed that coach Leigh Matthews was furious over the preliminary final location decision. Despite this setback, Brisbane beat Geelong and reached the grand final for the fourth consecutive year. Their opponents, Port Adelaide, playing in their first grand final, were too good on the day and recorded a 40-point win in what was the first-ever all-non-Victorian grand final. The grand final is partly remembered for a wild punch-up between Port Adelaide's Darryl Wakelin and Alastair Lynch, who was playing in his last-ever game and therefore immune from suspension.

 Rebuild & Michael Voss: 2005–2013 

The Lions endured a slow start to the 2005 season before having a form reversal towards the end of the year, which included ten-goal thrashings of top-four contenders Geelong and Melbourne. Going into Round 20, they were half a game clear inside the top eight and had one of the strongest percentages in the league. However, they would lose their final three games and miss the finals, with their season culminating in a record-breaking 139-point loss to St Kilda at the Telstra Dome. It remains the club's heaviest defeat, in addition to being the largest victory in the over-100-year history of St Kilda.  Some believed that the St Kilda game, rather than the 2004 Grand Final, had signaled the end of Brisbane's triple premiership dynasty.

The Lions began the 2006 season optimistically, but injuries plagued the club as they again missed the finals, with Brisbane's players recording an AFL record total of 200 matches lost to injury for the season.

The Brisbane Lions 2007 season started with them finishing runner up to Carlton in the 2007 NAB Cup Grand Final. The Lions would fail to make the finals for a third successive year, again showing promising glimpses at stages, with a shock away win against reigning premiers the West Coast Eagles, and a 93-point hiding of finalists Collingwood at the MCG. They made history in 2007 by becoming the first club in the history of the AFL to have five co-captains.

The team struggled during the 2008 season and missed out on the finals with a 10–12 record, losing 3 games despite having at least 5 more scoring shots in each of those games. Following the season, Coach Leigh Matthews resigned after 10 seasons and 3 premierships with the club. The Lions appointed former player and Captain Michael Voss as the coach ahead of 2009.

After only winning 2 games from the first 5 played in 2009, the club won 9 of the next 12 to sit in 6th on the Ladder, where they would finish the season. They would also record a strong victory over eventual premiers Geelong during this timeframe by 43 points. The club beat Carlton in their Elimination Final, coming from 30 points behind in the final quarter to win by 7 points, before losing to the Western Bulldogs in a Semi Final.

The 2009/2010 off-season was dominated by the arrival of Brendan Fevola from Carlton, with a belief in the club that Fevola could help them capitalise and improve upon their strong 2009 season. Indeed, the Lions won their first four matches of the 2010 season to be top of the ladder after four rounds, but they would only win three more games after that to finish 13th by the end of the season.

The Lions' 2010/2011 off-season was disrupted by the sacking of Fevola after just one season at the Lions, following repeated off-field indiscretions which included getting drunk in the Brisbane streets during New Year's Eve celebrations. On the field, the Lions won only four games for the year and finished 15th overall. The 2011 season saw the debut of another Queensland-based team, the Gold Coast Suns. The Suns, who were coming off a 139-point loss to Essendon the previous week, upset the Lions by 8 points in their first encounter.  Despite their worst season since 1998, coach Michael Voss was granted a contract extension after the board recommended that Voss was the best man to take the club forward into the future. Leading into season 2012, only two players from the triple-premiership winning team of 2001–2003 remained: Simon Black and Jonathan Brown.

The 2013 season started well for Brisbane, defeating Carlton in the final of the NAB Cup, with Daniel Rich winning the Michael Tuck Medal for best on ground. However, the club began its 2013 season with back-to-back losses to the Western Bulldogs and Adelaide. Injuries took a toll on the team, with young players Claye Beams and Jared Polec suffering severe injuries. In Round 13, Brisbane defeated second-placed Geelong, coming from 52 points down late in the third quarter to win by 5 points due to an Ash McGrath goal after the siren in his 200th match, in what would become known as the Miracle on Grass.

On 13 August 2013, coach Michael Voss was told that his contract would not be renewed.

On 18 October 2013, Brisbane Lions Hall of Famer Simon Black announced his retirement.

 Playing under Justin Leppitsch: 2014–2016 
On 25 August 2013, a former premiership player for the Lions, Justin Leppitsch, was confirmed to be the senior coach of the Lions for the next three seasons.

During Round 13, 2014 Lions captain Jonathan Brown was the victim of a facial injury in a clash between the Lions and the Greater Western Sydney Giants. He collided with Tomas Bugg's knee and was taken off the ground. He suffered a concussion and subsequently retired from football. His retirement, alongside the retirement of Ash McGrath, meant there were no players from the triple-premiership era remaining at the club.

On 29 August 2016, Leppitsch was sacked as coach of the Lions after multiple disappointing seasons.

 Chris Fagan era: 2017–present 
On 4 October 2016, Hawthorn football manager Chris Fagan was announced as Brisbane's senior coach from the 2017 season onwards.

The Lions claimed the 2017 wooden spoon, despite winning 5 games for the season, 2 more than the previous season. Their percentage of 74.3 was the worst in the league, behind Fremantle with a percentage of 74.4. The 2018 season was very similar, recording 5 wins to finish in 15th place, but multiple close losses showed signs of a young team about to breakout into finals contention. 

The Lions had a magnificent 2019 season, making the finals for the first time since 2009 and finishing second on the AFL ladder with 16 wins, behind minor premiers Geelong on percentage. However, Brisbane were bundled out of the finals in straight sets at the Gabba, losing to eventual premiers Richmond by 47 points in their qualifying final and then to eventual runners-up Greater Western Sydney by three points in their semi-final due to a late Brent Daniels goal. The Lions became the first team since Geelong in 1997 to finish second on the ladder and not progress to a preliminary final.

Brisbane repeated their form displayed in 2019 the following year, once again finishing in second position on percentage at the conclusion of the home-and-away season. They won 14 games in a shortened 17-game season. During their qualifying final, they defeated Richmond for the first time since 2009 and qualified for a preliminary final berth, but went on to be beaten by a more experienced Geelong side in that match.

After an inconsistent start to the 2021 season the Lions hit form, winning seven straight games to sit in the top four for most of the year. However, losses to Melbourne, Richmond, Hawthorn and St Kilda meant the Lions sat in fifth as of the final round.

With the double chance on the line, the Lions regained fourth spot in the dying seconds of their final home-and-away game against West Coast. A behind kicked by Lincoln McCarthy put them ahead of the fourth-placed Bulldogs by a single point of ladder percentage, and a goal after the siren from Charlie Cameron then sealed the result for the Lions, who finished in the top four for the third year running under Chris Fagan. However, the Lions bowed out in straight sets for the second time in three years after suffering losses to eventual premiers Melbourne and eventual runners-up Western Bulldogs in the finals, with the latter winning by a single point due to a contentious free kick paid to the Bulldogs in the final seconds of the game.

Brisbane reached the finals once again in 2022, but this time missed the top four. With a win-loss record of fifteen wins and seven losses, the Lions finished sixth and hosted seventh-placed Richmond at The Gabba in an Elimination Final. After a close game which had 17 lead changes, the Lions prevailed, defeating the Tigers by a margin of two points in a 106–104 victory thanks to a late Joe Daniher goal. The Lions then played the Melbourne Demons in the Semi-Final, and upset the reigning premiers against all odds, bundling them out in straight sets with a score of 92–79 to progress to their second Preliminary Final under Fagan, taking on Geelong once again in a rematch of the 2020 Preliminary Final.

Unfortunately for Brisbane, their impressive finals run came to an end against the Cats, suffering a 71-point defeat in the First Preliminary Final that ended their 2022 season.

Brisbane reinforced their squad with multiple star signings in the off-season, such as star midfielder Josh Dunkley, tall forward Jack Gunston and father-son draftee Will Ashcroft, to make them one of the competition's flag favourites for the 2023 AFL season. Additionally, Fagan also penned a two-year contract extension to keep him at the club until 2025, and Lachie Neale and Harris Andrews took over as co-captains from long-serving Lions veteran Dayne Zorko.

 Membership base & Sponsorship 

Crowds and memberships for the Brisbane Lions grew dramatically during the four seasons in which they made the AFL Grand Final.

The club still maintains healthy Victorian support due to their Fitzroy origins, and The Royal Derby Hotel in Fitzroy is the official social venue for Victorian Lions fans, showing all televised games, and displaying a mural of club greats Kevin Murray and Jonathan Brown on its Alexandra Parade side.

To add to this presence in Melbourne, the Lions Historical Society is based at Etihad stadium, containing exhibits of club history stretching from Fitzroy, to the Bears, and the Brisbane Lions.

A 2000 Roy Morgan AFL survey of household incomes suggested that Brisbane Lions supporters were among the lowest-earning supporters in the league.

Statistics highlighted in bold denote the best known season for Brisbane in that category
Statistics highlighted in italic denote the worst known season for Brisbane in that category

Non-playing/coaching staff

Sponsorship

Relationship with Fitzroy FC

Fitzroy FC Ltd came out of administration in 1998. For a brief time, it experimented in partnerships with other semi-professional and amateur clubs before incorporating the Fitzroy Reds in 2009 to play in the Victorian Amateur Football Association. While its AFL operations are run via the Brisbane Lions, Fitzroy largely resumed its original VFL/AFL identity playing in the VAFA through its continued use of their 1975–1996 VFL/AFL jumper, their club song, and their 1884–1966 home ground at the Brunswick Street Oval.

Fitzroy FC ltd improved its relationship with the Brisbane Lions in the ten years from 1999 to 2009. In that time Brisbane acknowledged the two parent clubs for the merger with the letters BBFFC printed below the back of the neck of the club's guernseys from 2002. Fitzroy's VAFA side played the curtain-raiser at the MCG when the Brisbane Lions met the Collingwood Magpies in the AFL Heritage Round of 2003. Brisbane also now wears a version of Fitzroy's AFL guernsey with red instead of maroon in most matches played in Victoria, consistent with Fitzroy's most recent colours.

Relationships between Fitzroy and Brisbane however were strained in late 2009, when Brisbane announced that it was adopting a new logo for season 2010 and beyond, which Fitzroy Football Club believed contravened Section 7.2 c) of the merger agreement. The new logo, a lion's head facing forward, replaced the former Fitzroy logo of a passant lion with a football. On 22 December 2009, Fitzroy lodged a Statement of Claim with the Supreme Court of Victoria, seeking an order that the Brisbane Lions be restrained from using as its logo, the new logo or any other logo other than 'the Fitzroy lion logo'. On 15 July 2010, the two clubs reached a settlement, agreeing that the Fitzroy logo symbolically represents the historic merger between the Bears and Fitzroy and the first 13 years of the Brisbane Lions competing in the AFL, and that Brisbane would use both the old and new logos alongside each other in an official capacity (e.g. on letterheads, marketing, etc.), with the old logo to be phased out altogether after 2014. Brisbane returned to using the old logo on its playing guernseys from 2015, but the new logo will remain for corporate purposes.

Since 2015, The Lions have kept strong ties with the Fitzroy Football Club in the VAFA and the Fitzroy junior football club. A one club approach has been taken from all parties and the Lions sponsor a male and female Fitzroy player each year, conduct coaching workshops for Fitzroy, and frequently invite the Fitzroy juniors to form a guard of honour for Victorian games. With many Fitzroy people having served on the Brisbane Lions board, both iterations of the club in the AFL and in the VAFA keeps it's history alive.

Club identity
Emblem
In 1997, the club unveiled its new merger emblem, consisting of the golden Fitzroy Lion on a badge of Maroon and Blue. The club used this emblem from 1997 until the end of 2001. In 2002, the club would unveil a new emblem in the shape of a football, emblazoned with the words "Brisbane Lions" and with the Fitzroy Lion located within the o of Lions. This emblem was used until 2010, when the emblem was again changed, this time in favour of a forward-facing Lion head.

 Guernseys 

Home Guernsey (worn 1997-2009 and since 2015): Predominantly maroon guernsey with a blue yoke featuring a golden Fitzroy Lion, with a gold collar and cuffs. For shorts, maroon home shorts are worn in home games, in away games played against the Sydney Swans and in the AFL Grand Final, should the Lions compete .

Away Guernsey (worn 2008-2009 and since 2015): Predominantly red guernsey with a blue yoke featuring a golden Fitzroy lion, with a blue collar and cuffs, and based on Fitzroy's final colours in the AFL. White away shorts are worn when this guernsey is used, except against the Gold Coast Suns, Greater Western Sydney Giants and Sydney Swans, when playing in the latter three's home games.

Clash Guernsey (worn since 2023): This predominantly gold guernsey features a maroon Fitzroy lion on a gold background (reminiscent of the Bears’ first guernsey), with a maroon yoke and golden cuffs. The same shorts as the Away Guernsey are worn and only wore against Gold Coast Suns and Greater Western Sydney Giants, in the latter two's home games.

Mascot
The Lion's Mascot Manor representative and club mascot was Bernie "Gabba" Vegas until 2016 when Roy the Lion (named Roy after the nickname for Fitzroy fans) replaced him as mascot. In 2021 the club unveiled their Lioness mascot Auroara.

Song
The club's team song, "The Pride of Brisbane Town", is based on the Fitzroy club song, and is sung to the music of "La Marseillaise", the French national anthem.

LyricsWe are the pride of Brisbane town,We wear maroon, blue and gold.We will always fight for victory,Like Fitzroy, and Bears of old.All for one, and one for all,We will answer to the call.Go Lions, Brisbane Lions,We'll kick the winning scoreYou'll hear our mighty roarTraining base

Between 1997 and 2022, the club trained out of the Gabba during the football season. The club's administrative and indoor training facilities were also located in the stadium. Due to the cricket season in the summer which is during the off-season for the Lions, the club was required to train at alternative locations over the years, this has included the University of Queensland campus, Leyshon Park in Yeronga, Giffin Park in Coorparoo, Moreton Bay Central Sports Complex in Burpengary and elsewhere, meaning the club lacked a dedicated and permanent home year-round. In 2020 the club announced that it would move its training and administrative facilities into Springfield Central Stadium (known for ground-sponsorship purposes as Brighton Homes Arena), an 8,000-capacity high-class facility in Ipswich that enables the club to base itself in the single location and play reserve-grade and AFLW matches at the one location. The Lions moved into the facility in October 2022.

Rivalries
Collingwood
The angst between supporters of Collingwood and Brisbane had been caused by plenty of history between the two clubs. Fitzroy and Collingwood are neighbouring inner northern Melbourne suburbs with a suburban boundary separating them down the middle of Smith Street. This meant they shared a fierce local rivalry pre-merger, but the rivalry between the Lions and the Magpies was properly ignited post-merger in late 1999 when Collingwood played their last ever AFL game at their spiritual home ground, Victoria Park. The Lions emerged 42 point victors that day and consigned the Magpies to their second wooden spoon in their VFL/AFL history. The rivalry between the two clubs peaked in the early 2000s, as the clubs played off in two consecutive Grand Finals in 2002 and 2003, with the Lions emerging victors on both occasions.

Gold Coast Suns

The Brisbane Lions have a rivalry with fellow Queensland AFL team the Gold Coast Suns. The two teams contest the QClash twice each season. The first QClash was held in 2011, with the game establishing the highest pay TV audience ever for an AFL game, with a total of 354,745 viewers watching the game.

The medal for the player adjudged best on ground is known as the Marcus Ashcroft Medal. It is named after former footballer Marcus Ashcroft, who played junior football on the Gold Coast for Southport and 318 VFL/AFL games for the Brisbane Bears/Lions between 1989 and 2003. He later joined Gold Coast's coaching staff and was the first Queenslander to play 300 VFL/AFL games. Lion Dayne Beams has won the medal three times, the most by any player.

The trophy awarded to the winner of the game is currently known as the "QClash Trophy". The trophy is a "traditional style" looking silver cup with a wooden base and a plaque. The plaque's inscription reads from left to right, "Brisbane Lions AFC", "QCLASH", "Gold Coast Suns FC".

Port Adelaide

The necessity of a merger between two AFL clubs in 1996 was to enable The Port Adelaide Football Club to enter the AFL in 1997. The result of this merger produced The Brisbane Lions, and fans of parent clubs Fitzroy and the Brisbane Bears were disappointed at losing their clubs as standalone entities due to Port's entry into the league. A rivalry quickly developed between the newly merged club and Port.

In their early days, the two clubs could not be separated and had multiple close encounters, with a draw in two of their first three meetings. In the early 2000s, the rivalry reached its peak as the two clubs would be the most dominant of the era, consistently finishing at the top of the ladder. Between 2001 and 2004, the clubs met each other in the 2001 Ansett Australia Cup Grand Final, a 2001 qualifying final, a 2002 preliminary final and the 2004 Grand Final. Other notable encounters from this period include a round 22 match in 2002 to determine the minor premiership that year, which Port Adelaide won by a single goal, and a round 17 match in 2003 with 7 lead changes in the final quarter, which Port Adelaide won by a point.

Honours
Club honours

Individual

Team of the Decade
In June 2006, to recognise ten years since the creation of the Brisbane Lions, a Team of the Decade was announced.

Hall of Fame

Legends

Inductees

Club facts
 Coaches (men's)

 Coaches (women's) 

 Captains (men's)

 Captains (women's) 

 Match records (men's)
 Biggest winning margin: 141 points – 29.15 (189) vs. Adelaide 6.12 (48), The Gabba, 24 July 2004
 Biggest losing margin: 139 points – 7.5 (47) vs. St Kilda 28.18 (186), Telstra Dome, 27 August 2005
 Highest score: 29.15 (189) vs. Adelaide, The Gabba, 24 July 2004
 Lowest score: 2.5 (17) vs. Richmond, MCG, 14 April 2018
 Highest score conceded: 28.18 (186) vs. St Kilda, Telstra Dome, 27 August 2005
 Lowest score conceded: 3.10 (28) vs. Essendon, Metricon Stadium, 31 July 2020
 Highest aggregate score: 293 points – Brisbane Lions 25.21 (171) vs. Fremantle 19.8 (122), The Gabba, 29 April 2001
 Lowest aggregate score: 76 points – Brisbane Lions 6.6 (42) vs. Collingwood 5.4 (34), The Gabba, 4 September 2020
 Most goals in a match: Jonathan Brown, ten goals vs. Carlton, The Gabba, 22 July 2007

 Biggest home crowds 

AFL finishing positions (1997–present)
Legend: Premiers, Wooden spoon

Players

Current squad

Reserves team

The Brisbane Lions have fielded reserves teams in various competitions since 1998. In its inaugural year (1997) the club affiliated with the Queensland Australian Football League (QAFL), allowing players not selected for the AFL team to be drafted to individual clubs. Between 1998 and 2010 the club's reserves team participated in the QAFL, where it was initially known as the "Lion Cubs", until 2004 when it became the Suncoast Lions. In 2011 the team, whose name was now formally the "Brisbane Lions reserves", moved to the multi-state North East Australian Football League (NEAFL). The Lions won their first reserve-grade premiership in 2001 when they defeated the Southport Sharks in the QAFL Grand Final, and went on to claim four NEAFL premierships in 2012/13 and 2017/19. Following the NEAFL's dissolvement after the 2019 season, the Lions reserves moved to the Victorian Football League (VFL), and commenced playing in the competition in 2021. The Lions currently play reserves matches at South Pine Sports Complex in Brendale, a facility opened in 2016.

Premierships

Season summaries

Statistics highlighted in bold denote the best known season for Brisbane in that category
Statistics highlighted in italic'' denote the worst known season for Brisbane in that category

AFL Women's team
In May 2016, the club launched a bid to enter a team in the inaugural AFL Women's season in 2017. 
The Brisbane Lions were granted a licence on 15 June 2016, becoming one of eight teams to compete in the league's first season. Former AFL Queensland employee Breeanna Brock was appointed to the position of Women's CEO the following day.

Tayla Harris and Sabrina Frederick-Traub were the club's first signings, unveiled along with the league's other 14 marquee players on 27 July 2016. A further 23 senior players and two rookie players were added to the club's inaugural list in the league's drafting and signing period. Emma Zielke captained the team for their inaugural season.

Former Collingwood and Brisbane Bears player and AFL Queensland coach Craig Starcevich was appointed the team's inaugural head coach in June 2016. The rest of the coaching team was announced on 8 November 2016 as David Lake as the midfield coach, Daniel Merrett as the backline coach and Brent Staker as the forward coach. Car company Hyundai, along with Epic Pharmacy, sponsored the team in 2017.

The Lions have been a successful team in the AFLW reaching the finals in 6 of the first 7 seasons. They've narrowly lost grand finals in 2017, 2018, and 2022, and only missed out on finals in 2019. Due to a shortened 2020 season, the Lions played a Qualifying Final against Carlton before the season was prematurely ended due to COVID border restrictions. No premiership was awarded in 2020.

In 2021 the team finally broke through to win their first premiership by defeating arch-rival Adelaide in the grand final.

The team plays its home games at Brighton Homes Arena in Brisbane.

Current squad

Non-playing/coaching staff

Season summaries

^ Denotes the ladder was split into two conferences. Figure refers to the club's overall finishing position in the home-and-away season. Daniel Merrett was coach for round 3, and Starcevich was coach for all other matches.

See also

 Wikipedia listing of Brisbane Lions players
 Merrett–Murray Medal
 Australian rules football in Queensland
 Sport in Queensland
 Sport in Australia
 Brisbane Broncos

References

External links

 
 The Brisbane Lions – an Overview – Official AFL website of the Brisbane Lions Football Club

 
1996 establishments in Australia
Australian Football League clubs
Australian rules football clubs in Brisbane
Australian rules football clubs in Queensland
Australian rules football clubs established in 1996
AFL Women's clubs